Teak is a species of large, deciduous tree.

Teak may also refer to:
Teak furniture
Teak Museum, in India
Hardtack Teak, a nuclear weapon test
, a ship in the US Navy